The Finisterre Range is a mountain range in north-eastern Papua New Guinea. The highest point is ranked 41st in the world by prominence with an elevation of 4,150 m. Although the range's high point is not named on official maps, the name "Mount Boising" is used locally. This peak was possibly the most prominent unclimbed peak in the world until the first known ascent on 25 June 2014.

The range runs into the Saruwaged Range to the east and together they form a natural barrier between the Ramu and Markham valleys to the south and Vitiaz Strait to the north. Many rivers originate in this range, including some tributaries of the Ramu.

The Finisterre Range campaign (1943–1944) of World War II, including a series of actions known as Battle of Shaggy Ridge, saw fierce fighting between Australian and Japanese forces.

See also 
 List of highest mountains of New Guinea
 List of Ultras of Oceania
 Finisterre languages

References 

Mountain ranges of Papua New Guinea
Huon Peninsula montane rain forests